The Maine Mall is an enclosed shopping mall in South Portland, Maine, United States. Owned and managed by Brookfield Properties, it is the largest shopping mall in the state of Maine, and the second-largest in northern New England, behind New Hampshire’s The Mall at Rockingham Park.

Its anchor stores are Best Buy, JCPenney, Jordan's Furniture, Macy's, and Round One Entertainment with two vacant anchors last occupied by Forever 21 and Sears.

History

In 1969, Jordan Marsh opened a freestanding store which was the first Jordan Marsh in the state of Maine.

In 1971, the indoor shopping mall and Sears were added.

Porteous, a department store chain based in Portland, Maine, opened in 1983 as part of a major mall expansion which doubled the size of the mall. This expansion also added JCPenney as well as the state's first Filene's.

In 1994, the mall underwent a $6.5 million renovation that added a food court as well as Lechmere and a larger Dream Machine, a video game and pinball machine arcade.

Porteous closed in 1996, and was replaced with a two-level structure containing a Filene's Home Store on the lower level and Sports Authority on the upper level, made accessible by the only mall escalators in Maine, excluding department stores. Jordan Marsh was acquired by Federated Department Stores in 1996; as a result, the mall's Jordan Marsh became Macy's.

In 1997, F. W. Woolworth Company and Lechmere both closed; within a year, they were replaced by Linens 'n Things and Best Buy, respectively.

In 2003, General Growth Properties acquired the mall for $270 million.

In 2005, Federated Department Stores acquired the Filene's chain. Due to the presence of an existing Macy's at the mall, both the Filene's and Filene's home store were shuttered in 2006 to prevent overlap.

The state's only Apple Store opened at the mall in 2008. In October 2019, it moved into a more central location in the building, occupying a space left by Abercrombie & Fitch's departure.

In late 2008, Forever 21 and H&M opened in the former Filene's Mens & Home first floor. Sports Authority remained in the former Filene's upper floor. 

In 2009, Linens 'n Things closed due to the liquidation of the chain.

On December 12, 2012, The Bon-Ton announced plans to open a store in the former Filene's space, which had been vacant since 2006. The store opened on September 12, 2013. This was Bon-Ton's only store in Maine and joined Sears, Macy's, and JCPenney to become the mall's fourth full-line department store.

In August 2016, Sports Authority closed due to bankruptcy.

On June 13, 2017, it was announced that Bon-Ton would be closing its store in August 2017.

On December 6, 2017, it was announced that Round One Entertainment will be opening in the former Sports Authority space in 2018.

The mall added Round One Entertainment, a Japanese-owned bowling and amusement store chain, in 2018.

On May 28, 2019, Jordan's Furniture announced that it would be opening in the former Filene's/Bon-Ton space; the store opened in 2020, and features a ropes course before the main entrance from the mall.

On June 26, 2020, it was announced that Sears would be closing 28 stores nationwide, including the store in The Maine Mall. The Sears store subsequently closed on September 13, 2020. Forever 21 also closed in 2020.

Olympia Sports closed in 2022, after the company liquidated.

Future

In November 2020, a proposed plan that hoped to transform a surplus of empty parking spaces at the Maine Mall into land for housing and recreation was detailed in the Portland Press Herald.

The Maine Mall Transit Oriented District Concept Plan was started by the Greater Portland Council of Governments and funded by a $20,000 federal grant. To make the mall more sustainable and attractive, the plan aims to accomplish three things: to reduce urban sprawl, reduce traffic congestion, and increase public transportation in the area around the mall.

The redevelopment plans for the Maine Mall hope to build on similar projects in the Greater Portland area, such as Rock Row in Westbrook. City organizers are hoping to take advantage of recent zoning changes that allows for housing development near the mall.

Transit-oriented development is at the center of such plans. The city already has five different bus routes that makes routine stops at the mall. The goal is to incentivize people to walk or use public transportation in the future.

The mall would still be the main attraction but will feature a more community-centered shopping experience. Through infill development, people will be able to live, work, go to the doctors, and have recreational activities all within proximity of the mall. The hope is that this will make people want to go to the mall.

In the proposed plan, the parking lots at the Maine Mall will be replaced with parking garages that have green spaces on their rooftop. A hotel, convention center, parks, and a baseball field are also a part of the plan.

References

External links
The Maine Mall web site

Shopping malls in Maine
Shopping malls established in 1971
Brookfield Properties
Buildings and structures in South Portland, Maine
Tourist attractions in Cumberland County, Maine
Economy of Cumberland County, Maine
1971 establishments in Maine